The 2000 Chicago White Sox season was the White Sox's 101st season. They finished the regular season with a 95-67 record, good enough for first place in the American League Central, 5 games ahead of the second place Cleveland Indians.

Regular season

2000 Opening Day lineup 

Ray Durham, 2B

José Valentín, SS

Frank Thomas, 1B

Magglio Ordóñez, RF

Paul Konerko, DH

Chris Singleton, CF

Carlos Lee, LF

Craig Wilson, 3B

Mark Johnson, C

Mike Sirotka, P

Season standings

Record vs. opponents

Notable transactions 
 July 29, 2000: Charles Johnson was traded by the Baltimore Orioles with Harold Baines to the Chicago White Sox for Brook Fordyce, Jason Lakman (minors), Juan Figueroa (minors), and Miguel Felix (minors).

Roster

Game log 

|- style="text-align:center;background-color:#ffbbbb"
| 1 || April 3 || @ Rangers || 4–10 || Rogers (1–0) || Sirotka (0–1) || || 2:39 || 49,332 || 0–1 || box
|- style="text-align:center;background-color:#ffbbbb"
| 2 || April 4 || @ Rangers || 8–12 || Cordero (1–0) || Simas (0–1) || || 3:47 || 29,418 || 0–2 || box
|- style="text-align:center;background-color:#bbffbb"
| 3 || April 5 || @ Rangers || 12–8 || Foulke (1–0) || Zimmerman (0–1) || || 3:30 || 25,544 || 1–2 || box
|- style="text-align:center;background-color:#bbffbb"
| 4 || April 6 || @ Rangers || 6–2 || Baldwin (1–0) || Loaiza (0–1) || || 2:23 || 28,466 || 2–2 || box
|- style="text-align:center;background-color:#bbffbb"
| 5 || April 7 || @ Athletics || 7–6 || Eyre (1–0) || Magnante (0–1) || Foulke (1) || 3:36 || 10,549 || 3–2 || box
|- style="text-align:center;background-color:#bbffbb"
| 6 || April 8 || @ Athletics || 7–3 || Sirotka (1–1) || Mahay (0–1) || || 2:59 || 13,125 || 4–2 || box
|- style="text-align:center;background-color:#ffbbbb"
| 7 || April 9 || @ Athletics || 2–14 || Appier (1–1) || K. Wells (0–1) || || 3:00 || 13,280 || 4–3 || box
|- style="text-align:center;background-color:#bbffbb"
| 8 || April 11 || @ Devil Rays || 13–6 || Parque (1–0) || Yan (0–1) || || 2:58 || 13,639 || 5–3 || box
|- style="text-align:center;background-color:#bbffbb"
| 9 || April 12 || @ Devil Rays || 7–1 || Baldwin (2–0) || Wheeler (0–1) || || 2:56 || 14,034 || 6–3 || box
|- style="text-align:center;background-color:#ffbbbb"
| 10 || April 13 || @ Devil Rays || 5 – 6 (12) || Mecir (2–0) || Sturtze (0–1) || || 4:04 || 15,464 || 6–4 || box
|- style="text-align:center;background-color:#bbffbb"
| 11 || April 14 || Angels || 9–4 || Sirotka (2–1) || Hill (1–2) || || 3:25 || 38,912 || 7–4 || box
|- style="text-align:center;background-color:#ffbbbb"
| 12 || April 15 || Angels || 1–3 || Bottenfield (1–1) || K. Wells (0–2) || Percival (3) || 2:51 || 14,135 || 7–5 || box
|- style="text-align:center;background-color:#ffbbbb"
| 13 || April 16 || Angels || 1–3 || Schoeneweis (3–0) || Parque (1–1) || Percival (4) || 2:35 || 10,929 || 7–6 || box
|- style="text-align:center;background-color:#bbbbbb"
| – || April 17 || Mariners ||colspan=8| Postponed (rain), rescheduled for August 8
|- style="text-align:center;background-color:#bbffbb"
| 14 || April 18 || Mariners || 18–11 || Sturtze (1–1) || Sele (1–1) || || 3:32 || 9,898 || 8–6 || box
|- style="text-align:center;background-color:#bbffbb"
| 15 || April 19 || Mariners || 5–2 || Lowe (1–0) || Meche (0–1) || Howry (1) || 2:57 || 8,425 || 9–6 || box
|- style="text-align:center;background-color:#bbffbb"
| 16 || April 21 || Tigers || 7–2 || K. Wells (1–2) || Nitkowski (1–3) || || 2:52 || 11,278 || 10–6 || box
|- style="text-align:center;background-color:#bbffbb"
| 17 || April 22 || Tigers || 14–6 || Parque (2–1) || Weaver (0–2) || || 3:19 || 16,410 || 11–6 || box
|- style="text-align:center;background-color:#bbffbb"
| 18 || April 23 || Tigers || 9–4 || Baldwin (3–0) || Borkowski (0–1) || || 2:47 || 12,154 || 12–6 || box
|- style="text-align:center;background-color:#bbffbb"
| 19 || April 24 || Orioles || 8–2 || Eldred (1–0) || Mussina (0–2) || || 2:14 || 15,461 || 13–6 || box
|- style="text-align:center;background-color:#ffbbbb"
| 20 || April 25 || Orioles || 6–12 || Rapp (3–0) || Sirotka (2–2) || || 3:15 || 11,658 || 13–7 || box
|- style="text-align:center;background-color:#bbffbb"
| 21 || April 26 || Orioles || 11–6 || K. Wells (2–2) || Ponson (2–1) || || 2:59 || 13,649 || 14–7 || box
|- style="text-align:center;background-color:#bbffbb"
| 22 || April 27 || Orioles || 13–4 || Parque (3–1) || Mercedes (2–1) || || 2:49 || 13,225 || 15–7 || box
|- style="text-align:center;background-color:#bbffbb"
| 23 || April 28 || @ Tigers || 3–2 || Baldwin (4–0) || Weaver (0–3) || Foulke (2) || 2:24 || 26,916 || 16–7 || box
|- style="text-align:center;background-color:#bbffbb"
| 24 || April 29 || @ Tigers || 2–1 || Eldred (2–0) || Mlicki (0–5) || Foulke (3) || 2:37 || 28,393 || 17–7 || box
|- style="text-align:center;background-color:#ffbbbb"
| 25 || April 30 || @ Tigers || 3 – 4 (12) || Anderson (1–0) || Eyre (1–1) || || 3:36 || 28,393 || 17–8 || box

|- style="text-align:center;background-color:#ffbbbb"
| 26 || May 1 || Blue Jays || 3–5 || Carpenter (3–3) || K. Wells (2–3) || Koch (6) || 2:58 || 14,448 || 17–9 || box
|- style="text-align:center;background-color:#ffbbbb"
| 27 || May 2 || Blue Jays || 1–4 || Castillo (1–2) || Wunsch (0–1) || Koch (7) || 3:06 || 10,397 || 17–10 || box
|- style="text-align:center;background-color:#bbffbb"
| 28 || May 3 || Blue Jays || 7–3 || Baldwin (5–0) || Escobar (2–4) || Foulke (4) || 2:39 || 12,026 || 18–10 || box
|- style="text-align:center;background-color:#ffbbbb"
| 29 || May 5 || @ Royals || 1–5 || Fussell (2–1) || Eldred (2–1) || || 2:38 || 19,622 || 18–11 || box
|- style="text-align:center;background-color:#ffbbbb"
| 30 || May 6 || @ Royals || 5–11 || Spradlin (1–1) || Sirotka (2–3) || || 2:53 || 28,300 || 18–12 || box
|- style="text-align:center;background-color:#ffbbbb"
| 31 || May 7 || @ Royals || 8–12 || Bottalico (4–1) || Wunsch (0–2) || || 3:25 || 23,107 || 18–13 || box
|- style="text-align:center;background-color:#ffbbbb"
| 32 || May 8 || @ Red Sox || 2–3 || Rose (2–2) || Sirotka (1–2) || Lowe (8) || 2:31 || 23,468 || 18–14 || box
|- style="text-align:center;background-color:#bbffbb"
| 33 || May 9 || @ Red Sox || 6–0 || Baldwin (6–0) || Schourek (1–3) || || 2:22 || 25,371 || 19–14 || box
|- style="text-align:center;background-color:#ffbbbb"
| 34 || May 10 || @ Red Sox || 3–5 || Martinez (3–2) || Eldred (2–2) || Garcés (1) || 2:16 || 28,911 || 19–15 || box
|- style="text-align:center;background-color:#ffbbbb"
| 35 || May 12 || Twins || 3 – 4 (10) || Miller (1–2) || Lowe (1–1) || Carrasco (1) || 3:22 || 12,526 || 19–16 || box
|- style="text-align:center;background-color:#bbffbb"
| 36 || May 13 || Twins || 4–3 || Wunsch (1–2) || Wells (0–4) || || 2:52 || 22,545 || 20–16 || box
|- style="text-align:center;background-color:#bbffbb"
| 37 || May 14 || Twins || 5–3 || Wunsch (2–2) || Radke (2–4) || Foulke (5) || 2:50 || 29,177 || 21–16 || box
|- style="text-align:center;background-color:#bbffbb"
| 38 || May 16 || @ Yankees || 4–0 || Eldred (3–2) || Hernández (4–3) || || 3:10 || 31,143 || 22–16 || box
|- style="text-align:center;background-color:#ffbbbb"
| 39 || May 17 || @ Yankees || 4–9 || Clemens (4–3) || Parque (3–2) || || 3:09 || 26,887 || 22–17 || box
|- style="text-align:center;background-color:#bbffbb"
| 40 || May 19 || @ Blue Jays || 5–3 || Sirotka (3–3) || Escobar (4–5) || Foulke (6) || 2:49 || 18,268 || 23–17 || box
|- style="text-align:center;background-color:#bbffbb"
| 41 || May 20 || @ Blue Jays || 6–2 || Baldwin (7–0) || D. Wells (7–2) || || 2:22 || 20,091 || 24–17 || box
|- style="text-align:center;background-color:#bbffbb"
| 42 || May 21 || @ Blue Jays || 2–1 || Eldred (4–2) || Castillo (1–4) || Foulke (7) || 2:39 || 18,264 || 25–17 || box
|- style="text-align:center;background-color:#ffbbbb"
| 43 || May 22 || @ Blue Jays || 3–4 || Koch (3–0) || Howry (0–1) || || 2:32 || 19,167 || 25–18 || box
|- style="text-align:center;background-color:#bbffbb"
| 44 || May 23 || Yankees || 8–2 || K. Wells (3–3) || Clemens (4–4) || || 2:53 || 21,863 || 26–18 || box
|- style="text-align:center;background-color:#ffbbbb"
| 45 || May 24 || Yankees || 4–12 || Pettitte (3–2) || Sirotka (3–4) || || 3:17 || 23,144 || 26–19 || box
|- style="text-align:center;background-color:#ffbbbb"
| 46 || May 25 || Yankees || 0–7 || Mendoza (5–2) || Baldwin (7–1) || || 2:21 || 23,636 || 26–20 || box
|- style="text-align:center;background-color:#bbffbb"
| 47 || May 26 || Indians || 5–3 || Eldred (5–2) || Finley (3–4) || Foulke (8) || 2:39 || 18,225 || 27–20 || box
|- style="text-align:center;background-color:#bbffbb"
| 48 || May 27 || Indians || 14–3 || Parque (4–2) || Wright (3–3) || || 3:10 || 30,250 || 28–20 || box
|- style="text-align:center;background-color:#ffbbbb"
| 49 || May 28 || Indians || 3–12 || Colón (5–2) || K. Wells (3–4) || || 4:01 || 24,192 || 28–21 || box
|- style="text-align:center;background-color:#ffbbbb"
| 50 || May 29 || @ Mariners || 4–5 || Halama (6–0) || Sirotka (3–5) || Sasaki || 3:05 || 34,429 || 28–22 || box
|- style="text-align:center;background-color:#bbffbb"
| 51 || May 30 || @ Mariners || 2–1 || Baldwin (8–1) || Abbott (1–2) || Foulke (9) || 2:26 || 25,788 || 29–22 || box
|- style="text-align:center;background-color:#bbffbb"
| 52 || May 31 || @ Mariners || 4–3 || Howry (1–1) || Sasaki (1–4) || Foulke (10) || 3:11 || 35,823 || 30–22 || box

|- style="text-align:center;background-color:#bbffbb"
| 53 || June 2 || @ Astros || 7–4 || Parque (5–2) || Reynolds (5–2) || Foulke (11) || 2:56 || 39,028 || 31–22 || box
|- style="text-align:center;background-color:#ffbbbb"
| 54 || June 3 || @ Astros || 1–6 || Holt (3–6) || K. Wells (3–5) || || 3:00 || 39,459 || 31–23 || box
|- style="text-align:center;background-color:#bbffbb"
| 55 || June 4 || @ Astros || 7–3 || Sirotka (4–5) || Dotel (1–4) || || 2:45 || 41,117 || 32–23 || box
|- style="text-align:center;background-color:#bbffbb"
| 56 || June 5 || @ Reds || 4–3 || Baldwin (9–1) || Parris (2–8) || Foulke (12) || 2:41 || 26,624 || 33–23 || box
|- style="text-align:center;background-color:#bbffbb"
| 57 || June 6 || @ Reds || 17–12 || Eldred (6–2) || Villone (6–3) || || 3:44 || 28,908 || 34–23 || box
|- style="text-align:center;background-color:#bbffbb"
| 58 || June 7 || @ Reds || 6–4 || Parque (6–2) || Bell (4–4) || Foulke (13) || 3:21 || 31,023 || 35–23 || box
|- style="text-align:center;background-color:#bbffbb"
| 59 || June 9 || Cubs || 6 – 5 (14) || Peña (1–0) || Van Poppel (0–2) || || 4:42 || 44,140 || 36–23 || box
|- style="text-align:center;background-color:#bbffbb"
| 60 || June 10 || Cubs || 4–3 || Sirotka (5–5) || Wood (2–4) || Foulke (14) || 3:05 || 43,806 || 37–23 || box
|- style="text-align:center;background-color:#ffbbbb"
| 61 || June 11 || Cubs || 5–6 || Van Poppel (1–2) || Peña (1–1) || Aguilera (12) || 2:59 || 43,158 || 37–24 || box
|- style="text-align:center;background-color:#bbffbb"
| 62 || June 12 || @ Indians || 8–7 || Eldred (7–2) || Rigdon (1–1) || Foulke (15) || 3:37 || 43,229 || 38–24 || box
|- style="text-align:center;background-color:#bbffbb"
| 63 || June 13 || @ Indians || 4 – 3 (10) || Simas (1–1) || Speier (0–1) || Howry (2) || 3:26 || 43,233 || 39–24 || box
|- style="text-align:center;background-color:#bbffbb"
| 64 || June 14 || @ Indians || 11–4 || Beirne (1–0) || Brower (1–1) || || 3:39 || 43,284 || 40–24 || box
|- style="text-align:center;background-color:#bbffbb"
| 65 || June 15 || @ Yankees || 12–3 || Sirotka (6–5) || Pettitte (6–3) || || 3:38 || 30,803 || 41–24 || box
|- style="text-align:center;background-color:#bbffbb"
| 66 || June 16 || @ Yankees || 3–1 || Baldwin (10–1) || Stanton (1–1) || Howry (3) || 2:54 || 41,910 || 42–24 || box
|- style="text-align:center;background-color:#bbffbb"
| 67 || June 17 || @ Yankees || 10–9 || Eldred (8–2) || Westbrook (0–1) || Foulke (16) || 3:43 || 54,053 || 43–24 || box
|- style="text-align:center;background-color:#bbffbb"
| 68 || June 18 || @ Yankees || 17–4 || Parque (7–2) || Hernández (6–6) || || 3:26 || 52,856 || 44–24 || box
|- style="text-align:center;background-color:#bbffbb"
| 69 || June 19 || Indians || 6–1 || K. Wells (4–5) || Colón (6–4) || || 3:04 || 43,062 || 45–24 || box
|- style="text-align:center;background-color:#ffbbbb"
| 70 || June 20 || Indians || 1–4 || Brower (2–1) || Sirotka (6–6) || Karsay (15) || 2:34 || 20,005 || 45–25 || box
|- style="text-align:center;background-color:#ffbbbb"
| 71 || June 21 || Indians || 6–8 || Burba (8–2) || Baldwin (10–2) || Karsay (16) || 3:00 || 23,516 || 45–26 || box
|- style="text-align:center;background-color:#bbffbb"
| 72 || June 22 || Indians || 6–0 || Eldred (9–2) || Finley (5–5) || || 2:52 || 23,374 || 46–26 || box
|- style="text-align:center;background-color:#bbffbb"
| 73 || June 23 || Yankees || 4–3 || Lowe (2–1) || Rivera (2–2) || || 3:10 || 38,773 || 47–26 || box
|- style="text-align:center;background-color:#ffbbbb"
| 74 || June 24 || Yankees || 8–12 || Mendoza (7–3) || K. Wells (4–6) || Rivera (17) || 3:56 || 32,623 || 47–27 || box
|- style="text-align:center;background-color:#bbffbb"
| 75 || June 25 || Yankees || 8–7 || Sirotka (7–6) || Pettitte (7–4) || Howry (4) || 3:15 || 40,817 || 48–27 || box
|- style="text-align:center;background-color:#ffbbbb"
| 76 || June 27 || Twins || 4–7 || Mays (4–9) || Baldwin (10–3) || Wells (5) || 3:07 || 20,283 || 48–28 || box
|- style="text-align:center;background-color:#bbffbb"
| 77 || June 28 || Twins || 7–3 || Eldred (10–2) || Lincoln (0–1) || || 2:52 || 17,541 || 49–28 || box
|- style="text-align:center;background-color:#ffbbbb"
| 78 || June 29 || Twins || 1–10 || Milton (8–2) || K. Wells (4–7) || || 3:04 || 21,239 || 49–29 || box
|- style="text-align:center;background-color:#bbffbb"
| 79 || June 30 || Red Sox || 10–4 || Parque (8–2) || Pichardo (2–1) || || 3:05 || 32,157 || 50–29 || box

|- style="text-align:center;background-color:#bbffbb"
| 80 || July 1 || Red Sox || 7–2 || Sirotka (8–6) || Crawford (0–1) || || 2:44 || 28,006 || 51–29 || box
|- style="text-align:center;background-color:#bbffbb"
| 81 || July 2 || Red Sox || 8–2 || Baldwin (11–3) || Schourek (2–7) || || 2:44 || 32,934 || 52–29 || box
|- style="text-align:center;background-color:#bbffbb"
| 82 || July 3 || @ Royals || 14–10 || Peña (2–1) || Santiago (6–3) || || 3:55 || 24,496 || 53–29 || box
|- style="text-align:center;background-color:#ffbbbb"
| 83 || July 4 || @ Royals || 7–10 || Spradlin (3–2) || Garland (0–1) || || 3:06 || 29,884 || 53–30 || box
|- style="text-align:center;background-color:#bbffbb"
| 84 || July 5 || @ Royals || 6 – 3 (13) || Wunsch (3–2) || Bochtler (0–1) || || 4:22 || 15,009 || 54–30 || box
|- style="text-align:center;background-color:#bbffbb"
| 85 || July 7 || @ Cubs || 4 – 2 (12) || Lowe (3–1) || Van Poppel (2–3) || Peña (1) || 3:23 || 39,112 || 55–30 || box
|- style="text-align:center;background-color:#ffbbbb"
| 86 || July 8 || @ Cubs || 2–9 || Lieber (8–5) || Baldwin (11–4) || || 2:40 || 38,933 || 55–31 || box
|- style="text-align:center;background-color:#ffbbbb"
| 87 || July 9 || @ Cubs || 6–9 || Tapani (5–7) || Simas (1–2) || Worrell (1) || 2:46 || 38,706 || 55–32 || box
|- style="text-align:center;"
|colspan="11" style="background-color:#bbcaff" | All-Star Break: AL defeats NL 6–3 at Turner Field
|- style="text-align:center;background-color:#ffbbbb"
| 88 || July 13 || Cardinals || 5–13 || Benes (10–3) || Sirotka (8–7) || || 3:17 || 32,263 || 55–33 || box
|- style="text-align:center;background-color:#ffbbbb"
| 89 || July 14 || Cardinals || 4–9 || Stephenson (10–5) || Wunsch (3–3) || || 3:25 || 34,862 || 55–34 || box
|- style="text-align:center;background-color:#bbffbb"
| 90 || July 15 || Cardinals || 15–7 || Parque (9–2) || Kile (11–6) || || 4:00 || 40,681 || 56–34 || box
|- style="text-align:center;background-color:#bbffbb"
| 91 || July 16 || Brewers || 11–5 || Baldwin (13–4) || Snyder (3–4) || || 2:47 || 30,050 || 57–34 || box
|- style="text-align:center;background-color:#bbffbb"
| 92 || July 17 || Brewers || 11–2 || Garland (1–1) || Bere (6–7) || || 2:53 || 31,369 || 58–34 || box
|- style="text-align:center;background-color:#bbffbb"
| 93 || July 18 || Brewers || 7–5 || Sirotka (9–7) || Wright (5–3) || Wunsch (1) || 3:00 || 18,542 || 59–34 || box
|- style="text-align:center;background-color:#bbffbb"
| 94 || July 19 || @ Twins || 3–2 || Buehrle (1–0) || Milton (8–6) || Foulke (17) || 2:46 || 12,494 || 60–34 || box
|- style="text-align:center;background-color:#ffbbbb"
| 95 || July 20 || @ Twins || 1–5 || Mays (5–11) || Parque (9–3) || || 2:35 || 18,676 || 60–35 || box
|- style="text-align:center;background-color:#bbffbb"
| 96 || July 21 || @ Red Sox || 8–5 || Simas (2–2) || Pichardo (4–2) || Howry (5) || 3:16 || 33,869 || 61–35 || box
|- style="text-align:center;background-color:#ffbbbb"
| 97 || July 22 || @ Red Sox || 6–8 || Fassero (7–3) || Garland (1–2) || || 2:59 || 33,384 || 61–36 || box
|- style="text-align:center;background-color:#ffbbbb"
| 98 || July 23 || @ Red Sox || 0–1 || Martínez (11–3) || Sirotka (9–8) || || 2:28 || 33,224 || 61–37 || box
|- style="text-align:center;background-color:#bbffbb"
| 99 || July 24 || Royals || 7–6 || Wunsch (4–3) || Suzuki (5–5) || Foulke (18) || 3:08 || 34,473 || 62–37 || box
|- style="text-align:center;background-color:#ffbbbb"
| 100 || July 25 || Royals || 1–6 || Suppan (5–6) || Parque (9–4) || || 2:42 || 21,091 || 62–38 || box
|- style="text-align:center;background-color:#ffbbbb"
| 101 || July 26 || Royals || 6–7 || Spradlin (4–2) || Howry (1–2) || Bottalico (8) || 3:10 || 26,615 || 62–39 || box
|- style="text-align:center;background-color:#bbffbb"
| 102 || July 27 || @ Angels || 6–5 || Garland (2–2) || Cooper (4–5) || Foulke (19) || 3:24 || 24,394 || 63–39 || box
|- style="text-align:center;background-color:#ffbbbb"
| 103 || July 28 || @ Angels || 7–10 || Holtz (1–2) || Beirne (1–1) || Percival (24) || 3:13 || 40,711 || 63–40 || box
|- style="text-align:center;background-color:#ffbbbb"
| 104 || July 29 || @ Angels || 5–6 || Bottenfield (7–8) || Barceló (0–1) || Percival (25) || 3:09 || 25,881 || 63–41 || box
|- style="text-align:center;background-color:#bbffbb"
| 105 || July 30 || @ Angels || 11 – 7 (10) || Foulke (2–0) || Levine (2–4) || || 4:09 || 27,538 || 64–41 || box

|- style="text-align:center;background-color:#bbffbb"
| 106 || August 1 || @ Rangers || 4–3 || Howry (2–2) || Wetteland (4–4) || || 2:42 || 37,784 || 65–41 || box
|- style="text-align:center;background-color:#ffbbbb"
| 107 || August 2 || @ Rangers || 2–7 || Helling (13–7) || Garland (2–3) || Crabtree (1) || 2:57 || 36,786 || 65–42 || box
|- style="text-align:center;background-color:#ffbbbb"
| 108 || August 4 || Athletics || 3–5 || Appier (10–8) || Sirotka (9–9) || Isringhausen (25) || 3:22 || 30,019 || 65–43 || box
|- style="text-align:center;background-color:#bbffbb"
| 109 || August 5 || Athletics || 4 – 3 (10) || Foulke (3–0) || Mathews (2–3) || || 3:14 || 35,314 || 66–43 || box
|- style="text-align:center;background-color:#bbffbb"
| 110 || August 6 || Athletics || 13–0 || Baldwin (14–4) || Hudson (12–4) || || 2:50 || 32,952 || 67–43 || box
|- style="text-align:center;background-color:#ffbbbb"
| 111 || August 8 || Mariners || 4–12 || Piñeiro (1–0) || Garland (2–4) || Tomko (1) || 3:11 || 23,647 || 67–44 || box
|- style="text-align:center;background-color:#ffbbbb"
| 112 || August 8 || Mariners || 5–7 || García (4–2) || Buehrle (1–1) || Sasaki (27) || 3:43 || 23,647 || 67–45 || box
|- style="text-align:center;background-color:#bbffbb"
| 113 || August 9 || Mariners || 19–3 || Sirotka (10–9) || Moyer (11–5) || || 3:10 || 24,947 || 68–45 || box
|- style="text-align:center;background-color:#ffbbbb"
| 114 || August 10 || Mariners || 3–6 || Sele (13–6) || Biddle (0–1) || Sasaki (28) || 2:41 || 23,924 || 68–46 || box
|- style="text-align:center;background-color:#bbffbb"
| 115 || August 11 || @ Devil Rays || 6–5 || Buehrle (2–1) || Wilson (0–1) || Foulke (20) || 3:13 || 18,370 || 69–46 || box
|- style="text-align:center;background-color:#bbffbb"
| 116 || August 12 || @ Devil Rays || 5 – 4 (10) || Buehrle (3–1) || Hernández (3–4) || Foulke (21) || 3:12 || 27,538 || 70–46 || box
|- style="text-align:center;background-color:#ffbbbb"
| 117 || August 13 || @ Devil Rays || 3–5 || López (10–8) || Howry (2–3) || || 2:28 || 19,685 || 70–47 || box
|- style="text-align:center;background-color:#ffbbbb"
| 118 || August 14 || @ Orioles || 2–8 || Mercedes (8–4) || Sirotka (10–10) || || 3:02 || 40,047 || 70–48 || box
|- style="text-align:center;background-color:#bbffbb"
| 119 || August 15 || @ Orioles || 14–4 || Biddle (1–1) || Johnson (1–9) || || 2:48 || 37,707 || 71–48 || box
|- style="text-align:center;background-color:#bbffbb"
| 120 || August 16 || @ Orioles || 7–3 || Parque (10–4) || Mussina (7–13) || || 2:35 || 39,079 || 72–48 || box
|- style="text-align:center;background-color:#ffbbbb"
| 121 || August 17 || @ Orioles || 3–5 || Parrish (2–1) || Baldwin (14–5) || || 2:52 || 40,205 || 72–49 || box
|- style="text-align:center;background-color:#bbffbb"
| 122 || August 18 || Devil Rays || 5–2 || Garland (3–4) || Rekar (4–8) || Foulke (22) || 2:36 || 25,160 || 73–49 || box
|- style="text-align:center;background-color:#bbffbb"
| 123 || August 19 || Devil Rays || 7–0 || Sirotka (11–10) || López (10–9) || || 2:32 || 38,926 || 74–49 || box
|- style="text-align:center;background-color:#ffbbbb"
| 124 || August 20 || Devil Rays || 11–12 || Yan (6–8) || Foulke (3–1) || Hernández (23) || 3:45 || 27,744 || 74–50 || box
|- style="text-align:center;background-color:#ffbbbb"
| 125 || August 21 || Devil Rays || 4–11 || Sturtze (5–2) || Parque (10–5) || || 2:57 || 31,744 || 74–51 || box
|- style="text-align:center;background-color:#bbffbb"
| 126 || August 23 || Orioles || 8–4 || Barceló (1–1) || Parrish (2–2) || || 3:14 || 22,528 || 75–51 || box
|- style="text-align:center;background-color:#ffbbbb"
| 127 || August 24 || Orioles || 5–8 || Mercedes (9–5) || Hill (5–8) || || 3:15 || 20,007 || 75–52 || box
|- style="text-align:center;background-color:#bbffbb"
| 128 || August 25 || @ Mariners || 4–1 || Sirotka (12–10) || Sele (13–9) || Foulke (23) || 3:08 || 44,745 || 76–52 || box
|- style="text-align:center;background-color:#ffbbbb"
| 129 || August 26 || @ Mariners || 5–11 || Halama (11–6) || Biddle (1–2) || || 3:36 || 45,191 || 76–53 || box
|- style="text-align:center;background-color:#bbffbb"
| 130 || August 27 || @ Mariners || 2–1 || Barceló (2–1) || García (4–4) || Foulke (24) || 2:44 || 45,525 || 77–53 || box
|- style="text-align:center;background-color:#ffbbbb"
| 131 || August 28 || @ Athletics || 0–3 || Hudson (14–6) || Parque (10–6) || || 2:19 || 12,436 || 77–54 || box
|- style="text-align:center;background-color:#bbffbb"
| 132 || August 29 || @ Athletics || 3–0 || Baldwin (15–5) || Zito (2–3) || Foulke (25) || 2:20 || 12,129 || 78–54 || box
|- style="text-align:center;background-color:#bbffbb"
| 133 || August 30 || @ Athletics || 8–3 || Sirotka (13–10) || Appier (12–10) || Howry (6) || 3:05 || 19,458 || 79–54 || box

|- style="text-align:center;background-color:#bbffbb"
| 134 || September 1 || Angels || 9–8 || Ginter (1–0) || Hasegawa (8–3) || Foulke (26) || 3:06 || 16,377 || 80–54 || box
|- style="text-align:center;background-color:#bbffbb"
| 135 || September 2 || Angels || 13–6 || Parque (11–6) || Mercker (1–3) || || 3:09 || 29,785 || 81–54 || box
|- style="text-align:center;background-color:#bbffbb"
| 136 || September 3 || Angels || 13–12 || Wunsch (5–3) || Hasegawa (8–4) || Foulke (27) || 3:38 || 22,020 || 82–54 || box
|- style="text-align:center;background-color:#ffbbbb"
| 137 || September 4 || Rangers || 4–5 || Davis (6–5) || Garland (3–5) || Wetteland (29) || 3:14 || 29,614 || 82–55 || box
|- style="text-align:center;background-color:#ffbbbb"
| 138 || September 5 || Rangers || 1–2 || Johnson (1–0) || Howry (2–4) || Wetteland (30) || 2:58 || 13,899 || 82–56 || box
|- style="text-align:center;background-color:#bbffbb"
| 139 || September 6 || Rangers || 13–1 || K. Wells (5–7) || Helling (14–11) || || 2:41 || 15,622 || 83–56 || box
|- style="text-align:center;background-color:#bbffbb"
| 140 || September 7 || Rangers || 10–6 || Barceló (3–1) || Zimmerman (3–5) || Foulke (28) || 2:49 || 18,219 || 84–56 || box
|- style="text-align:center;background-color:#bbffbb"
| 141 || September 8 || @ Indians || 5–4 || Buehrle (4–1) || Woodard (2–10) || Foulke (29) || 3:34 || 42,526 || 85–56 || box
|- style="text-align:center;background-color:#ffbbbb"
| 142 || September 9 || @ Indians || 3–9 || Burba (14–6) || Garland (3–6) || || 3:23 || 42,561 || 85–57 || box
|- style="text-align:center;background-color:#bbbbbb"
| – || September 10 || @ Indians ||colspan=8| Postponed (rain), rescheduled for September 25
|- style="text-align:center;background-color:#bbffbb"
| 143 || September 11 || Tigers || 10–3 || Sirotka (14–10) || Moehler (12–8) || Howry (7) || 3:15 || 21,527 || 86–57 || box
|- style="text-align:center;background-color:#ffbbbb"
| 144 || September 12 || Tigers || 3–10 || Mlicki (5–11) || K. Wells (5–8) || || 3:09 || 15,297 || 86–58 || box
|- style="text-align:center;background-color:#bbffbb"
| 145 || September 13 || Tigers || 1–0 || Parque (12–6) || Weaver (9–14) || Foulke (30) || 2:38 || 16,651 || 87–58 || box
|- style="text-align:center;background-color:#ffbbbb"
| 146 || September 15 || Blue Jays || 5–6 || Escobar (10–14) || Garland (3–7) || Koch (33) || 3:18 || 23,105 || 87–59 || box
|- style="text-align:center;background-color:#bbffbb"
| 147 || September 16 || Blue Jays || 6–3 || Wunsch (6–3) || Escobar (10–15) || Foulke (31) || 2:43 || 33,204 || 88–59 || box
|- style="text-align:center;background-color:#ffbbbb"
| 148 || September 17 || Blue Jays || 1–14 || Painter (2–0) || K. Wells (5–9) || || 3:06 || 26,113 || 88–60 || box
|- style="text-align:center;background-color:#ffbbbb"
| 149 || September 18 || @ Tigers || 2–5 || Weaver (10–14) || Barceló (3–2) || Jones (40) || 2:42 || 22,718 || 88–61 || box
|- style="text-align:center;background-color:#bbffbb"
| 150 || September 19 || @ Tigers || 6–2 || Lowe (4–1) || Sparks (6–5) || || 2:32 || 24,951 || 89–61 || box
|- style="text-align:center;background-color:#bbffbb"
| 151 || September 20 || @ Tigers || 13–6 || Garland (4–7) || Moehler (12–9) || || 3:00 || 28,422 || 90–61 || box
|- style="text-align:center;background-color:#bbffbb"
| 152 || September 21 || @ Twins || 9–4 || Sirotka (15–10) || Santana (2–3) || || 3:03 || 6,688 || 91–61 || box
|- style="text-align:center;background-color:#bbffbb"
| 153 || September 22 || @ Twins || 5–4 || Barceló (4–2) || Wells (0–7) || Foulke (32) || 2:57 || 9,060 || 92–61 || box
|- style="text-align:center;background-color:#bbffbb"
| 154 || September 23 || @ Twins || 5–3 || Parque (13–6) || Milton (13–10) || Foulke (33) || 2:50 || 20,263 || 93–61 || box
|- style="text-align:center;background-color:#ffbbbb"
| 155 || September 24 || @ Twins || 5 – 6 (10) || Guardado (6–3) || Beirne (1–2) || || 3:06 || 9,716 || 93–62 || box
|- style="text-align:center;background-color:#ffbbbb"
| 156 || September 25 || @ Indians || 2–9 || Burba (16–6) || Garland (4–8) || || 3:03 || 42,500 || 93–63 || box
|- style="text-align:center;background-color:#ffbbbb"
| 157 || September 26 || Red Sox || 3–4 || Martínez (18–6) || Beirne (1–3) || Lowe (39) || 2:31 || 23,319 || 93–64 || box
|- style="text-align:center;background-color:#ffbbbb"
| 158 || September 27 || Red Sox || 1–2 || Crawford (2–1) || Baldwin (15–6) || Lowe (40) || 2:21 || 16,368 || 93–65 || box
|- style="text-align:center;background-color:#ffbbbb"
| 159 || September 28 || Red Sox || 6–7 || Beck (3–0) || Simas (2–3) || Lowe (41) || 3:23 || 18,326 || 93–66 || box
|- style="text-align:center;background-color:#bbffbb"
| 160 || September 29 || Royals || 6–4 || Bradford (1–0) || Reichert (8–10) || Foulke (34) || 2:53 || 17,735 || 94–66 || box
|- style="text-align:center;background-color:#bbffbb"
| 161 || September 30 || Royals || 9–1 || K. Wells (6–9) || Stein (8–5) || || 2:43 || 29,692 || 95–66 || box
|- style="text-align:center;background-color:#ffbbbb"
| 162 || October 1 || Royals || 2–6 || Fussell (5–3) || Baldwin (15–7) || || 2:58 || 30,071 || 95–67 || box

|- style="text-align:center;background-color:#ffbbbb"
| 1 || October 3 || Mariners || 4–7 || Mesa (1–0) || Foulke (0–1) || Sasaki (1) || 4:12 || 45,290 || 0–1 || box
|- style="text-align:center;background-color:#ffbbbb"
| 2 || October 4 || Mariners || 2–5 || Abbott (1–0) || Sirotka (0–1) || Sasaki (2) || 3:16 || 45,383 || 0–2 || box
|- style="text-align:center;background-color:#ffbbbb"
| 3 || October 6 || @ Mariners || 1–2 || Paniagua (1–0) || Wunsch (0–1) || || 2:40 || 40,142 || 0–3 || box

Player stats

Batting 
Note: G = Games played; AB = At bats; R = Runs scored; H = Hits; 2B = Doubles; 3B = Triples; HR = Home runs; RBI = Runs batted in; BB = Base on balls; SO = Strikeouts; AVG = Batting average; SB = Stolen bases

Pitching 
Note: W = Wins; L = Losses; ERA = Earned run average; G = Games pitched; GS = Games started; SV = Saves; IP = Innings pitched; H = Hits allowed; R = Runs allowed; ER = Earned runs allowed; HR = Home runs allowed; BB = Walks allowed; K = Strikeouts

ALDS 

Seattle defeated the White Sox in a 3-game sweep.

Awards and honors 
 Jerry Manuel, Associated Press Manager of the Year

Farm system

References

External links 
 2000 Chicago White Sox at Baseball Reference
 Chicago White Sox at Baseball Almanac

Chicago White Sox seasons
Chicago White Sox season
American League Central champion seasons
Chicago White Sox